David Fifita (born 25 February 2000) is a Tonga international rugby league footballer who plays as a er for the Gold Coast Titans in the NRL.

He previously played for the Brisbane Broncos in the National Rugby League and has played for the Indigenous All Stars, Queensland, the Prime Minister's XIII.

Early life
Fifita was born in Brisbane, Queensland, Australia, and is of Torres Strait Islander descent on his mother's side and Tongan descent on his father's side.

Fifita was educated at Keebra Park State High School and his playing style had been compared to former Bronco Ben Te'o. NRL commentator Andrew Voss rated Fifita as the best young schoolboy forward he has seen in over 20 years of calling the GIO Schoolboy Cup.

Fifita is the cousin of Cronulla-Sutherland Sharks player Andrew Fifita and his twin David.

Playing career

Early career
Fifita played his junior rugby league for Souths Acacia Ridge. In 2015, he was 18th man for the Queensland Under-16 rugby league team, despite being a year younger. He then competed at the ASSRL U15s Tournament, playing for Queensland U15s Schoolboys Maroons team. He was selected for the Australian U15s Schoolboys Merit team. He was part of the Keebra Park side, which also featured Payne Haas, that narrowly lost to Westfields Sports High School in the GIO Schoolboy Cup Final. In 2017, Fifita competed at the ASSRL U18s Tournament, playing for Queensland U18s Schoolboys team. He was chosen for the Australian U18s Schoolboys team, which toured New Zealand. Later in the year, he captained Keebra Park in the GIO Schoolboy Cup Final against Westfields Sports High School, which Keebra Park won.

2018
On 13 February 2018, extended his contract with the Brisbane Broncos to the end of the 2020 NRL season. Fifita started by the year by playing in the Queensland Cup for the Souths Logan Magpies. In Round 16 of the 2018 NRL season, Fifita made his NRL debut for the Brisbane Broncos against the Canberra Raiders, becoming the first player born in the 2000s to make his NRL debut. Fifita played 47 minutes off the interchange bench during the 26-22 comeback win at Suncorp Stadium and coach Wayne Bennett commented on his impressive debut, "I liked it because he played mistake free and that is all you can ask", "He was good and never let anybody down, He did a really good job for us." In Round 23 against the South Sydney Rabbitohs, Fifita scored his first NRL career try in Brisbane's 38–18 win at Suncorp Stadium. Fifita finished his promising NRL debut year with him playing in 11 matches and scoring 2 tries for Brisbane in the 2018 NRL season. On 17 December 2018, Fifita was selected in the 15-man emerging Queensland squad.

2019
On 15 February 2019, Fifita represented the Indigenous All Stars against the New Zealand Māori All Stars team, playing off the interchange bench and scoring a try in the 34–14 win at AAMI Park. After having some solid performances leading up to the 2019 State of Origin series, Fifita earned selection in the Queensland Maroons squad. Fifita made history as he was the first player born in the 2000s to play Origin, Queensland Coach Kevin Walters commenting about his selection, "I rang him and told him he had made the Queensland under 18 team," Walters said on Monday. "He said, 'No, I am too old for that, "I said, 'Well you better come and play Origin then.'"

On 30 September, Fifita was named on the bench for the Australia PM XIII side. On 7 October 2019, Fifita was named at second row for the U23 Junior Australian side.

2020
On 27 April, it was revealed that Fifita would be ruled out from playing indefinitely after undergoing knee surgery.
On July 25, it was announced that Fifita had signed a record three-year deal, worth over $3 million with the Gold Coast.

Fifita played nine games for Brisbane in the 2020 NRL season as the club finished last on the table for the first time ever in their history.  Brisbane only managed to win only three games for the entire year out of a possible 20 matches.

2021
In round 5 of the 2021 NRL season, he scored a hat-trick in the Gold Coast's 42-16 victory over Newcastle.

In round 7 against South Sydney, he scored his second hat-trick of the year in a 30-40 loss.

On 11 May, Fifita was suspended for two matches after being found guilty of a careless high tackle during the club's round 9 victory over Wests Tigers.

Fifita played for Queensland in the first two games of the 2021 State of Origin series before being suspended for game 3.

In round 25, Fifita scored two tries for the Gold Coast in a 44-0 victory over the New Zealand Warriors.

2022
Following the Gold Coast's round 8 loss to Penrith, it was revealed that Fifita had suffered a grade 2 MCL sprain and would miss four matches.

Controversy
On 9 November 2019, Fifita was arrested in Bali after an alleged altercation with a bouncer at a nightclub called La Favela. On 11 November, Fifita was released from jail after the bouncer who was allegedly assaulted accepted Fifita's apology.  After Fifita left the prison, he spoke to the media saying "I want to thank everyone involved and obviously, the police. I will make a further statement later in the week".

On 13 November 2019, it was revealed by Fairfax Media that Fifita secured his freedom from the Bali jail after paying $30,000 and signing a "peace agreement".  They also revealed that  Fifita spent five hours in isolation immediately after his arrest.  He was then presented with a local legal representative and signed over power of attorney before a Brisbane welfare officer arrived to help negotiate the peace agreement.  He was also forced to urinate in a water bottle in his cell.

Brisbane Broncos CEO Paul White spoke to the media saying "I don’t know too many 19-year-old men ... of his background, who have had an experience like that, I know, having a policing background, that being in a cell is not a great experience, and being in one in a foreign country was pretty confronting.  He’ll learn a big lesson".

On 27 December 2020, Fifita was arrested and later released without charge after trespassing following a night of drinking. It was reported that Fifita was invited back to the room of an unidentified female but went to the wrong room at the address with other people inside who later called the police on Fifita.

In February 2021, the NRL reopened its investigation into the trespassing situation as it was revealed that the Gold Coast had made a payment to the family where Fifita had trespassed, which is a breach of salary cap rules.  In June 2021, Fifita was fined $20,000 for breaching the league's alcohol code of conduct and bringing the game into disrepute.  This was in relation to the trespassing incident which happened in December 2020.
On 31 December 2022, it was reported that Fifita had been involved with a verbal altercation with Brisbane player Reece Walsh at a Gold Coast nightclub. It was alleged the pair needed to be separated by security staff.

References

External links

Brisbane Broncos profile

2000 births
Living people
Australian sportspeople of Tongan descent
Australian rugby league players
Brisbane Broncos players
Gold Coast Titans players
Queensland Rugby League State of Origin players
David
Indigenous All Stars players
Indigenous Australian rugby league players
Rugby league players from Brisbane
Rugby league second-rows
Souths Logan Magpies players
Tonga national rugby league team players